is a large trans-Neptunian object (TNO) orbiting the Sun near the outer edge of the Kuiper belt. Its discovery images were taken in 2007, and its absolute magnitude of 4.5 is one of the twenty brightest exhibited by TNOs. Assuming it has a typical albedo, this would make it roughly the same size as Ixion (about 530–620 km diameter). 

Observations by Brown in 2012, using the W. M. Keck Observatory, suggest that  does not have a companion.

, it is about 41.3 AU from the Sun.

See also
 List of Solar System objects by size

References

External links 
 List of Transneptunian Objects, Minor Planet Center
 

Trans-Neptunian objects
Discoveries by the Palomar Observatory
Possible dwarf planets
20070514